Petrozavodsk (Karelian, Vepsian and ) is the capital city of the Republic of Karelia, Russia, which stretches along the western shore of Lake Onega for some . The population of the city was 280,890 as of 2022.

Etymology 
The name of the city is a combination of words Peter (Peter the Great) and zavod (meaning factory).

It was previously known as Shuysky Zavod (1703–1704) and Petrovskaya Sloboda (1704–1777), which was the first name of the city related to Peter the Great. It was renamed to Petrozavodsk after Catherine the Great granted the settlement the status of a city.

An ancient Swedish name was Onegaborg, known from a map from 1592 of the Flemish cartographer Abraham Ortelius, and hence translated to Finnish as Äänislinna, a name used during the occupation of Eastern Karelia by Finnish forces during the Continuation War (1941–1944) in the context of World War II.

History

Archeological discoveries in the urban area indicate the presence of a settlement as far back as seven thousand years ago, and during the Middle Ages the site of modern city was marked by several lakeside villages.  Within the city limits, the district of Solomennoje appears in surviving records dating back to the sixteenth century, and a map produced by the Flemish cartographer Abraham Ortelius at the end of that century places a settlement here called Onegaborg on the site of modern Petrozavodsk.

On 11 September 1703, Prince Menshikov founded the settlement of Petrovskaya Sloboda ("Petrine Sloboda"). He did so at the behest of Tsar Peter the Great, who needed a new iron foundry to manufacture cannons and anchors for the Baltic Fleet at the time of the Great Northern War (1700–1721). At first the foundry used the name Shuysky zavod (literally, "factory at the Shuya River"), but a decade later it became Petrovsky zavod ("Petrine factory"), after the name of the reigning monarch. From this form the present name of the city derives.

By 1717, Petrovskaya Sloboda had grown into the largest settlement in Karelia, with about 3,500 inhabitants, a timber fort, a covered market, and miniature palaces of the Tsar and Menshikov. The town's best-known landmark became the wooden church of Saints Peter and Paul, rebuilt in 1772 and renovated in 1789. The church retained its original iconostasis until this relic of Peter's reign was destroyed by fire on October 30, 1924.

After Peter's death, Petrovskaya Sloboda became depopulated and the factory declined. It closed down in 1734, although foreign industrialists maintained copper factories in the vicinity.

The industry revived in 1773 when Catherine the Great established a new iron foundry upstream the Lososinka River. Designed to provide cannons for the ongoing Russo-Turkish Wars, the foundry was named Alexandrovsky, after Alexander Nevsky, who was considered a patron saint of the region. The factory was modernized and expanded under supervision of Charles Gascoigne in 1787–96. Local pundits claim that the first railway in the world (чугунный колесопровод) was inaugurated for industrial uses of the Alexandrovsky foundry in 1788.

During Catherine's municipal reform of 1777, Petrovskaya Sloboda was incorporated as a town, whereupon its name was changed to Petrozavodsk. A new Neoclassical city center was then built, focused on the newly planned Round Square. In 1784 Petrozavodsk was large enough to supplant Olonets as the administrative center of the region. Although Emperor Paul abolished Olonets Governorate, it was revived as a separate guberniya in 1801, with Petrozavodsk as its administrative center.

During the Finnish occupation in the World War II (1941–1944), the city was styled as Äänislinna (or Ääneslinna), rather than the traditional Petroskoi. This name was a literal translation of Onegaborg, the name of a settlement marked on a 16th-century map by Abraham Ortelius near the present-day city, Ääninen being the Finnish toponym for Lake Onega. On 14 October 1941, occupation authorities opened the first concentration camp. By the liberation of Petrozavodsk there were 11 concentration camps.

In 1977, Petrozavodsk was the epicenter of what is called the Petrozavodsk phenomenon.

Administrative and municipal status
Petrozavodsk is the capital of the republic and, within the framework of administrative divisions, it also serves as the administrative center of Prionezhsky District, even though it is not a part of it. As an administrative division, it is incorporated separately as the city of republic significance of Petrozavodsk—an administrative unit with the status equal to that of the administrative divisions of the Republic of Karelia. As a municipal division, the city of republic significance of Petrozavodsk is incorporated as Petrozavodsky Urban Okrug.

Landmarks

Petrozavodsk is distinguished among other towns of North Russia by its Neoclassical architectural heritage, which includes the Round Square (1775, reconstructed in 1789 and 1839) and the Alexander Nevsky Cathedral (consecrated in 1832). Among the town's landmarks are the outdoor statues of Peter I (bronze and granite, Ippolit Monighetti, 1873), Gavrila Derzhavin (a Russian poet who was the governor of Olonets in the 18th century), and Alexander Nevsky (erected outside Alexander Nevsky Cathedral in 2010).

The city has a fine frontage on the Gulf of Petrozavodsk. The modern embankment, inaugurated in 1994, displays an assortment of Karelian granites and marbles. It is lined with extravagant postmodernist sculptures presented by sister cities of Petrozavodsk from around the world. There is also a birch copse, where the first church of Petrozavodsk was built in 1703.

Petrozavodsk is home to the Karelia Philharmonic Orchestra (1933), the Karelian Musical Theater (1955, statuary by Sergey Konenkov), National Library of Karelia (1959), Finnish-speaking National Theatre of Karelia (1965), Petrozavodsk State University, a conservatory, a city museum founded in 1871, and a branch of the Russian Academy of Sciences.

One of the city's central landmarks is Lenin Square, an oval space with a large Soviet-era statue of Lenin in the center. The square is especially notable for English-speaking visitors because it is also called "round square" - an oxymoron in English, but not in Russian (kruglaya ploshad).

Suburbs

The village of Shoksha near Petrozavodsk contains a quarry of red and pink quartzite which was used in construction of Saint Isaac's Cathedral and Lenin Mausoleum, among many other notable structures. There are also other quarries in the region excavating road aggregates (Goloday Gora – gabbro-diabase) near Derevyanka.

The suburb of Martsialnye Vody is the oldest spa in Russia, founded by Peter the Great in 1714 and visited by the Tsar on four occasions. Its name means "The Waters of Mars" in Russian. Although Peter's palace at Martsialnye Vody has not survived, there is a museum devoted to the spa's history.

From Petrozavodsk Harbor, a hydrofoil service of "KareliaFlot" company carries people to the island of Kizhi, a World Heritage Site with an outdoor museum of ancient wooden architecture.

Transportation

The city is served by the Petrozavodsk Airport, and a train station on the Kirov Railway with train connections to the main population centers of Russia.

An international tourist route Blue Highway goes through Petrozavodsk.

Geography

Climate 
Under the Köppen climate classification, Petrozavodsk experiences a climate on the boundary between a subarctic (Dfc) and humid continental (Dfb), though unlike other localities in Russia on its latitude, temperatures are relatively mild and there is no permafrost. This is due to the moderating influence of the Baltic Sea and the many nearby lakes. Winters, though long and cold, are mild for the high latitude, while summers are short and warm. The lake influence is stronger in summer, where Petrozavodsk has quite low diurnal temperature variation with mild nights for its latitude. Precipitation averages  annually.

Notable people
Vladimir Drachev, biathlete
Denis Zubko, association football player
Sergey Katanandov, Head of the Republic of Karelia in 2002–2010
Anastasia Maksimova, Rhythmic Gymnnast
Timur Dibirov, handball player
Irina Sidorkova, racing driver

Twin towns – sister cities

Petrozavodsk is twinned with:

 Alytus, Lithuania
 Brest, Belarus
 Duluth, United States
 Joensuu, Finland
 Narva, Estonia
 Neubrandenburg, Germany
 Rana, Norway
 La Rochelle, France
 Tübingen, Germany
 Umeå, Sweden
 Vagharshapat, Armenia
 Varkaus, Finland

In popular culture
In American television series The Sopranos, Tony Soprano's mistress, Irina Peltsin, is from Petrozavodsk.

See also
 Saint Petersburg
 Sortavala

References

Notes

Sources

External links

Official website of Petrozavodsk 
Official website of Petrozavodsk  
Unofficial website of Petrozavodsk 
Official website of the Board of Culture of Petrozavodsky Urban Okrug 
Kizhi Museum

 
Petrozavodsky Uyezd
Populated places established in 1703
1703 establishments in Russia
Renamed localities of Karelia